The fort was part of the defensive system of the Roman province of Dacia in the 2nd and 3rd centuries AD. The ruins of a contemporary nearby defensive ditch was also unearthed. The ruins of the castellum are located in Abrud (Romania).

See also
List of castra

External links
Roman castra from Romania - Google Maps / Earth

Notes

Roman legionary fortresses in Romania
Ancient history of Transylvania
Historic monuments in Alba County